Panzaleo (Pansaleo, Quito, Latacunga) is a poorly attested and unclassified indigenous American language that was spoken in the region of Quito until the 17th century.

Attestation
Much of the information on Panzaleo comes from toponyms of central and northern Ecuador. Typical are: 

-(h)aló: Pilaló, Mulahaló
-leo: Tisaleo, Pelileo
-lagua / -ragua: Cutuglagua, Tungurahua

Classification
Loukotka (1968) suggested that Panzaleo might be related to Paez. (See Paezan languages.) One of his sources for this proposal was Jijón y Caamaño (1940), who admit that the evidence is weak and may have been due to language contact.

References

Sources
 Jijón y Caamaño, Jacinto (1936–8): Sebastián de Benalcázar, vol. 1 (1936) Quito: Imprenta del Clero; vol. 2 (1938) Quito: Editorial Ecuatoriana.
 Jijón y Caamaño, Jacinto (1940–5): El Ecuador interandino y occidental antes de la conquista castellana, vol. 1 (1940), vol. 2 (1941), vol. 3 (1943), vol. 4 (1945). Quito: Editorial Ecuatoriana (1998 edition, Quito: Abya-Yala).
 Jiménez de la Espada, Marcos, ed. (1965 [1586]): Relaciones geográficas de Indias: Perú, 3 vols. Biblioteca de Autores Españoles 183–5. Madrid: Atlas.

Indigenous languages of South America
Unclassified languages of South America
Macro-Paesan languages